The 2022–23 season is the 93rd in the history of Wolfsberger AC and their 11th consecutive season in the top flight. The club will participate in Austrian Football Bundesliga, the Austrian Cup, and the UEFA Europa Conference League.

Players

Out on loan

Transfers

Pre-season and friendlies

Competitions

Overall record

Austrian Football Bundesliga

League table

Results summary

Results by round

Matches 
The league fixtures were announced on 22 June 2022.

Austrian Cup

UEFA Europa Conference League

Third qualifying round 
The draw for the third qualifying round was held on 18 July 2022.

Play-off round 
The draw for the play-off round was held on 2 August 2022.

References 

Wolfsberger AC seasons
Wolfsberger
Wolfsberger